Alberto Fortis (1741–1803) was an Italian writer, naturalist and cartographer, citizen of Republic of Venice.

Life
His real name was Giovanni Battista Fortis (his religious name was Alberto) and he was born in Padua on either 9 or 11 of November 1741. He journeyed extensively in Venetian Dalmatia. His best known work is Viaggio in Dalmazia ("Journey to Dalmatia"), originally published in 1774 and first published in London in 1778.

The highlight of the book is the description of Morlachia, a historical region currently located in Croatia named after the Morlachs that inhabited the region. In his book, Fortis presented his literary discovery "Hasanaginica" as a Morlach (Vlach) ballad. Larry Wolf believed Fortis wrote the ballad as a poetry of South Slavs rather than a poetry of the Morlachs. Fortis believed that the Morlachs preserved their old customs
and clothes. Their ethnographic traits were traditional clothings, use of the gusle musical instrument accompanied with epic singing. He also published several specimens of Morlach songs. Fortis noted that the Slavic-speaking Morlachs called themselves “Vlachs”, but refuted the assumption that they might be related to the Latin-speaking Vlachs.

Alberto Fortis's account of the Morlachs, translated into French, English and German brought the Morlachs to the attention of Europe. This started a new literary movement known as Morlachism.

The Croatian writer Ivan Lovrić, who wrote Osservazioni di Giovanni Lovrich sopra diversi pezzi del viaggio in Dalmazia del signor abbot Alberto Fortis coll'aggiunta della vita di Soçivizça ("Observations of Giovanni Lovrich [Ivan Lovrić] on several pieces of the journey to Dalmatia of Mr. Abbot Alberto Fortis with the addition of the life of Soçivizça"), accused Fortis of many factual errors, which he attempted to rectify. Travels into Dalmatia played an important role in bringing the Dalmatian culture to the attention of Europe during the rise of Romantic notions about folklore. Dalmatian hinterlands became epitomized by Hasanaginica, a folk ballad that was first written down by Fortis.

In 1795 Fortis was elected Fellow of the Royal Society in London. He died in Bologna eight years later on 21 October 1803.

Works

Notes

References

Bibliography

External links
 
 

1741 births
1803 deaths
Writers from Padua
Fellows of the Royal Society
18th-century Venetian writers
Italian naturalists
18th-century naturalists
19th-century naturalists
History of Dalmatia
Venetian period in the history of Croatia
18th-century cartographers